Beyg Rezai (also Romanized as Beyg Reẕā’ī; also known as Şeyed Ayāz-e Beyg Reẕā'ī) is a village in Gowavar Rural District, Govar District, Gilan-e Gharb County, Kermanshah Province, Iran. At the 2006 census, its population was 643, in 143 families.

References 

Populated places in Gilan-e Gharb County